The 2008 Ordina Open men's singles was one of the competitions of the 2008 Ordina Open tennis tournament held in Rosmalen, Netherlands. The event was held from 15 through 21 June and comprised a draw of 32 players of which eight were seeded. Four players gained entry through the qualification tournament and additionally three players received a wild card for direct admission into the draw.

Ivan Ljubičić was the defending champion of the men's singles tennis event at the Rosmalen Grass Court Championships, but lost in the second round to Viktor Troicki.

First-seeded David Ferrer won in the final 6–4, 6–2, against unseeded Marc Gicquel and earned €59,100 first-prize money as well as 175 ranking points.

Seeds

Draw

Finals

Top half

Bottom half

External links
 Singles draw
 Qualifying draw

Men's Singles
Ordina Open